Divided refers to arithmetic division in mathematics.

Divided may also refer to:

Television 
 Divided (British game show), a 2009–2010 game show
 Divided (American game show), a 2017–2018 U.S. version of the British show
 Divided (Indian game show), a 2018 Tamil-language game show
 "Divided" (Stargate Universe), an episode of Stargate Universe
 "Divided" (Arrow), an episode of Arrow

Music 
 The Divided, a British metal band
 Divided (EP), a 2010 EP by Benevolent
 "Divided" (song), a 1999 song by Tara MacLean
 "Divided", an instrumental by Linkin Park

Books
 Divided (book), a 2018 non-fiction book by Tim Marshall

See also
 Divided By (album), a 2011 album by Structures